The III Corps of the Grande Armée was a French military unit that existed during the Napoleonic Wars. The corps came to prominence between 1805 and 1809 under the command of Marshal Louis-Nicolas Davout, when it repeatedly scored impressive victories single-handedly or in conjunction with other French forces. Napoleon called it "My tenth legion", in reference to Julius Caesar's finest unit, the X Equestris. Troops from III Corps then took part in many battles in Poland, during the War of the Fourth Coalition, e.g. Czarnowo, Pultusk, Golymin, Eylau.. These troops were later reorganized as the I Corps and included French, German, and Polish units.

Size
By the time of Napoleon's invasion of Russia in 1812, the III Corps had been reorganized and went under the command of Marshal Michel Ney. It consisted of a mixture of Croatian, French, Portuguese, Dutch and Württemberger units and like the rest of Napoleon's forces, suffered heavy casualties as the campaign progressed. At the crossing of the Niemen River in June 1812, the size of the corps was estimated at around 44,000 men; by the Battle of Smolensk in August, only 22,000 men remained.

Battles
The corps participated in a number of battles, including Austerlitz, Auerstedt, Eylau, Borodino, Lützen, Bautzen, Katzbach, Leipzig, Ligny, and Waterloo.

Commanders
Corps commander: Marshal Louis-Nicolas Davout (1805 through 1809); 
Divisional commanders:
General Louis Friant
General Charles-Étienne Gudin de La Sablonnière
General Charles Antoine Morand
General Louis Vincent Le Blond de Saint-Hilaire
 Corps cavalry under General of Brigade Louis-Pierre Montbrun

Corps commander: Marshal Michel Ney (1812-1813)
Divisional commanders:
General Ledru (1812), later General Girard (1813)
General Razout (1812), later General Ricard (1813)
General Royal Prince of Württemberg, later General of Division Jean Gabriel Marchand
General Souham (1813)
General Montmorand (1813)
Corps cavalry under General-Major Woellwarth (1812), later General of Brigade Laboissière

Corps commander: General Joseph Souham (1813)
Divisional commanders:
General Brayer
General Delmas
General Ricard
Corps cavalry under General of Brigade Beurmann

Corps commander: General Dominique Vandamme (1815)
Divisional commanders:
General Lefol
General Habert
General Berthézène
Corps cavalry under General Domon

References and notes

GAI03